Field Marshal Sir John Wilfred Stanier,  (6 October 1925 – 10 November 2007) was a senior British Army officer who was Chief of the General Staff from 1982 to 1985. He was the first person after the Second World War to become the professional head of the British Army without having seen active service in that war or any subsequent campaign.

Early life and education
Stanier was born in Sawbridgeworth, Hertfordshire, the son of Harold Allan Stanier and Penelope Rose Stanier (née Price). His father was badly wounded in the First World War, but was employed by John Spedan Lewis to manage his farms. He was educated at Marlborough College and took a short wartime course at Merton College, Oxford.

Army career

Stanier volunteered for the Army in 1943, and having trained at Sandhurst and Bovington, was commissioned into the 7th Queen's Own Hussars on 19 April 1946. Promoted to lieutenant on 16 October 1948, he served with the intelligence branch in Italy in 1949 before being posted to the British Army of the Rhine in 1950. He was promoted to captain on 6 October 1952 and became an instructor at the Mons Officer Cadet School in Aldershot in April 1954, before attending the Staff College, Camberley in 1957. Following the merger of his regiment with the 3rd The King's Own Hussars, he became an officer in the Queen's Own Hussars in 1958 and was posted to the Directorate of Military Operations at the War Office, before being appointed military assistant to Sir William Stratton, Vice-Chief of the Imperial General Staff in July 1959. Promoted to major on 6 October 1959, he was appointed a Member of the Order of the British Empire in the New Year Honours 1961. He attended the Joint Services Staff College and, from 1962, commanded the tanks in "C" Squadron of his regiment in Germany, before returning to Camberley as Director of Studies in 1963.

Stainer was not selected to command the Queen's Own Hussars. Disappointed, he considered leaving the Army, but was pleasantly surprised, having transferred to the Royal Scots Greys on 1 January 1966, to be promoted to lieutenant-colonel on 2 May 1966 and made commanding officer of the Royal Scots Greys. He joined the staff of the Imperial Defence College in December 1968, and was then promoted two ranks to brigadier on 31 December 1969 and took command of 20th Armoured Brigade in the British Army of the Rhine in January 1970. After serving as the Army's director of public relations in London from 1971, he was appointed General Officer Commanding 1st Division on 3 November 1973 with the substantive rank of major-general from 21 January 1974. He became Commandant at the Staff College, Camberley on 22 December 1975.

He was appointed a Knight Commander of the Order of the Bath in the Queen's Birthday Honours 1978, and became Vice Chief of the General Staff with the rank of lieutenant general on 1 June 1978. The Challenger tank was brought into service during his period in this post. Promoted to full general on 1 January 1981, he was made Commander-in-Chief, UK Land Forces in April 1981. He became ADC General to the Queen from 7 April 1981, was advanced to Knight Grand Cross of the Order of the Bath in the Queen's Birthday Honours 1982 and became Chief of the General Staff on 1 August 1982. He was the first person after the Second World War to become the professional head of the British Army without having seen active service in that war or any subsequent campaign. He was promoted to field marshal on 10 July 1985 on retirement from the British Army.

He was also Colonel of the Royal Scots Dragoon Guards from 18 January 1979 to 6 May 1984, and Colonel Commandant of the Royal Armoured Corps from 1 April 1982 to 1 August 1985.

In retirement he served as chairman of the Royal United Service Institution from 1986 to 1989. He was Constable of the Tower of London from 1990 to 1996. His book War and the Media, co-authored with Miles Hudson, was published in 1997. He was a Deputy Lieutenant of Hampshire from 1987, and lived near Hartley Wintney.

His interests included fly fishing, sailing and horse riding and he was also President of the Hampshire branch of the British Red Cross Society from 1986 to 1994. He was also a Member of the Council of Marlborough College. He died on 10 November 2007.

Family
In 1955 he married Cicely Constance Lambert; they had four daughters.

References

Further reading

External links
Obituary, The Times, 13 November 2007

|-

|-

|-

|-

|-

British field marshals
7th Queen's Own Hussars officers
Royal Scots Greys officers
British Army personnel of the Falklands War
Knights Grand Cross of the Order of the Bath
Members of the Order of the British Empire
People educated at Marlborough College
Alumni of Merton College, Oxford
Graduates of the Royal Military College, Sandhurst
1925 births
2007 deaths
Graduates of the Staff College, Camberley
Chiefs of the General Staff (United Kingdom)
People from Sawbridgeworth
Constables of the Tower of London
Commandants of the Staff College, Camberley
Military personnel from Hertfordshire